Charise Matthaei (born 19 October 2000) is a German ice dancer. With her former skating partner, Maximilian Pfisterer, she is a two-time German national junior champion and competed in the final segment at two World Junior Championships (2018, 2019). They placed 11th at the 2016 Winter Youth Olympics in Hamar, Norway. Since Mai 2022 she competes with her skating partner, Max Liebers, at the senior level in ice dance.

Matthaei/Pfisterer teamed up in August 2015 and split in 2019. Then she retired from competitive skating in 2019, but came back to skate with Liebers in Mai 2022.

Coach in Chemnitz: Hendrik Hilpert, Susan Fichtelmann. Choreographer/Coach in Mailand: Barbara Fusar-Poli, Roberto Pelizolla, Lukáš Csölley.

Programs 
(with Pfisterer)

Competitive highlights 
CS: Challenger Series; JGP: Junior Grand Prix

Ice dancing with Liebers

Ice dancing with Pfisterer

Ladies' singles

References

External links 
 
 
 

2000 births
Figure skaters at the 2016 Winter Youth Olympics
German female ice dancers
Living people
Figure skaters from Berlin
21st-century German women
Competitors at the 2023 Winter World University Games